railML (Railway Markup Language) is an open, XML based data exchange format for data interoperability of railway applications.

Motivation

The growing number of computer applications modeling different aspects of railway operations, with different operators developing separate solutions parallelly, bore a chronic difficulty of connecting different railway IT applications. The exchange of data for operation concepts, slot management, simulation or infrastructure planning, etc. was possible either by hand or with a lot of special developed interfaces with loss of time and cost problems for railway companies. If there are n applications that are supposed to exchange data, with a special interface for each pair of programs respectively,  interfaces are required — only one, if n=2, but 10, if n=5 — increasing the complexity above average.

This problem can be mitigated by means of Enterprise application integration with a single, universal exchange format that is supported by all applications and meets the needs of all kinds of data exchange in the field of railway operation: The number of required interfaces decreases to n — one interface to the exchange format for each application respectively. railML tries to place at disposal an open and free, easy and handy, self-describing format close to existing standards. The paradigm is to meet the demands of the data exchange processes of railways, industry and authorities rather than describing the complete railway system.

Outline

History
The development of railML was initiated in early 2002 by the Fraunhofer-IVI (Dresden, Germany) and the ETH Zürich – IVT (Zurich, Switzerland) against the background of the chronic difficulty of connecting different railway IT applications. railML is changed and adapted to the needs of railway infrastructure managers (IM's) and railway undertakings (RU's) within discussions. The first stable version 1.0 was released in 2005 for productive usage. Up to now the versions 1.0; 1.1; 2.0 to 2.4 were released for download and productive use. railML's version 3 with a new topology model based on RailTopoModel and other evolutions was under development since mid 2015 to be released as beta in mid 2016 and finally released for productive use in February 2019. In 2015 a viewer and validator programme for railML data named railVIVID was released.

Working principle
railML (railway mark-up language) is a common exchange format, which employs the systematic of XML for the description of rail-specific data. railML enables the exchange of railway data between internal and external railway applications. railML is developed within the so-called “railML consortium” from railML.org. It is an open source exchange format under creative commons license (A free registration on railML is mandatory for the usage and download of railML schemes). The model language of railML is UML and the documentation language is English. Every railML developer and user is invited to contribute or propose scheme extensions.

Applications can exchange data via railML either via exporting respectively importing railML files, or as a direct Inter-process communication via TCP/IP.

Licensing and pricing
The usage of railML is possible at no charge for the users and developers, only consulting and certification for professional usage could be liable to pay costs for the software developer.

Versions 0.x and 1.x were licensed under a proprietary license, where version 0.x was intended only for internal use and shared within the consortium.

Version 2.0 to 2.2 used to be licensed with the Creative Commons license CC-BY-NC-SA until June 2013. Since July 2013 all versions from 2.0 onward were offered parallelly either with a commercial usable CC-BY-ND (V 3) license or with a restricted CC-BY-NC-ND (V 3) license. The restrictions serve quality measures, e.g. by requiring applications to be certified to grant for smooth interoperability.

Version 3.x is licensed under the same Creative Commons conditions, but in CC version 4.0. With this railML.org adapts the enhancements made by CC and garanties schema user the same usage rights as in previous years and railML versions.

The Logo and the word railML are a registered as trademarks by the railML consortium at the EUIPO.

Legal entity
Legal entity for the so-called railML consortium is the railML.org e.V. a registered non-profit association by German law (registration number VR 5750 at the local court in Dresden/Germany) since April 23, 2012.

railML schemes
railML is based on XML and sub-areas use other existing XML-schemes such as MathML and GML. It is composed of sub-schemes. Through version 2.4, three sub-schemes are in productive use:
timetable for the description of timetables,
infrastructure for the (priority topological) description of tracks and signalling equipment and
rolling stock for the description of vehicles.

Since railML version 3.1 an additional sub-scheme was introduced due to the demand of the community:

interlocking for the description of signaling routes

Additional sub-schemes are station facilities (ticket machines, waiting rooms, vending machines, etc.) or crew rostering (shift planning/rosters and working time management for conductors, etc.) are currently on hold, as there is no demand from the users.

Timetable
This sub-schema serves the exchange of detailed timetables. Particularly, the schema is designed for the following information:
 Train running times (arrivals, departures and passing times)
Operating Periods: the days on which a train is operated
 Train Parts: scheduling and routing information for through coaches in trains, e.g. the Orient Express on the traject from Budapest to Beograd on Mondays.
 Trains: a collection of train parts, adding up to the colloquial perspective, e.g. the Orient Express.
 Rostering: Circulation plans for rolling stock, linked with Train Parts.

Infrastructure
The focus of this sub-schema is the infrastructure of railway networks. Important aspects are:
 Network topology
 Coordinates
 Geometry: track geometry (gradient, curve radius)
 Railway infrastructure elements: inventory like balises and signals
 Further located elements: abstract things that cannot be touched but located, like speed limits and track condition

Rolling stock
While the Infrastructure sub-schema is focused on immobile assets, Rolling stock describes assets circulating in the network.
Vehicles
Formations: the combination of vehicles as a train
Tractive effort of locomotives and motor units

Interlocking

Signal aspects derived from train routes through stations

Code example
Example for a time table formulated in railML
<?xml version="1.0" encoding="UTF-8"?>
<railml xmlns:xsi="http://www.w3.org/2000/10/XMLSchema-instance" xsi:noNamespaceSchemaLocation="timetable.xsd">
	<timetable version="1.1">
		<train trainID="RX 100.2" type="planned" source="opentrack">
			<timetableentries>
				<entry posID="ZU" departure="06:08:00" type="begin"/>
				<entry posID="ZWI" departure="06:10:30" type="pass"/>
				<entry posID="ZOER" arrival="06:16:00" departure="06:17:00" minStopTime="9" type="stop"/>
				<entry posID="WS" departure="06:21:00" type="pass"/>
				<entry posID="DUE" departure="06:23:00" type="pass"/>
				<entry posID="SCW" departure="06:27:00" type="pass"/>
				<entry posID="NAE" departure="06:29:00" type="pass"/>
				<entry posID="UST" arrival="06:34:30" type="stop"/>
			</timetableentries>
		</train>
	</timetable>
</railml>
Line 3 expresses that the employed railML-version is 1.1.

Line 4 bears the train code.

Lines 5 and 15 frame the itinerary with, in this case, 8 itinerary entries.

The itinerary entries in line 6 to 14 have arguments like position ID (e.g. a station), time of departure or arrival, and in line 9 an obligation to stop.

Versions

Usage of railML data
At the beginning the most employed usage of railML data was timetable data for passenger information, duty planning for conductors and drivers and timetable simulation, following the usage of railML data for interlocking planning and infrastructure like network statements of IM's.

Computer programmes
Applications using railML version 2.x include a lot of timetable related programmes like OpenTrack (interactive railway simulator), FBS (planning software for railway operation), Viriato (scheduling system) and OpenTimeTable (real time analysis of network operation data). Applications using railML version 3.x include additionally BIM related infrastructure planning software like VIS All 3D or railway survey systems like GPSinfradat.

A complete list of programmes with (certified) interfaces is available at railML's website of compatible applications.

railVIVID
railVIVID is an open source freeware tool provided by UIC and railML.org to validate railML files of version 2.x or higher and to show the content of railML files in some special views. This shall give also non-IT-experts an easy and handy access to railML data. Therefore, some sights of railway data can be shown, copied and printed with railVIVID:
 Graphic viewer for Timetable data
 Tabular viewer for Timetable data with spreadsheet export
 Rolling Stock data viewer
 Topologic viewer for Infrastructure data
 Geographic viewer for Infrastructure data
 Schema validator for railML

railVIVID is available via railML's website for free. There are binary versions for Microsoft Windows and Java, also the source code was published in Autumn 2015 under the EUPL licence.

railML.org initiative
The development of railML is driven by the railML.org – Initiative, a development partnership of independent companies and organizations and European railways. The participation on the development and semi-annual conferences to exchange experience and discuss basics is open. The continuous development work is mainly internet-based (German and English forums). The organisation of the discussions is managed by so-called railML Coordinators. The (free) membership of the railML.org Consortium is mandatory for the download and usage of railML schemes. Obtaining a commercial certification is required before any commercial or productive use of software interfaces for the format.

Members
Members of railML.org are currently:
 Railways like Austrian Federal Railways, BLS, French Railways, German State Railway, Infrabel, Norwegian Rail Infrastructure Manager, Swiss Federal Railways,  ...
 Software manufacturers like Hacon (Hanover/Germany), iRFP (Dresden/Germany), PTV (Karlsruhe/Germany), SMA (Zurich/Switzerland), Trapeze Group (Hamburg/Germany), Siemens (Brunswick/Erlangen/Germany), Thales (Berlin & Ditzingen/Germany), ...
 Authorities like Bavarian Passenger Transport Authority (Munich/Germany), Federal Ministry of Transport and Digital Infrastructure (Berlin/Germany), High Speed Two (London/Great Britain), Jernbanedirektoratet (Oslo/Norway), ...
 Universities and Research institutes like Czech Technical University Prague, Dresden University, DLR, ETH Zurich, University of Birmingham, ...
A complete and updated list is published at the website of railML.org community.

Cooperations
railML.org works in the ERIM (abbreviation for European Rail Infrastructure Masterplan) project of the International Union of Railways (UIC) for the development of RailTopoModel as a common data model in the railway sector. Also railML.org cooperates with Eurocontrol and European Union Agency for Railways.

References

External links
 railML Homepage
 railML discussion board

Industry-specific XML-based standards
XML markup languages
Rail transport
Railway associations
Transport organizations based in Europe
Standards organizations